Dùn Dubh is a hillfort, located on the Inner Hebridean island of Coll. The fort is one of three associated with a local tradition which states that they were once the fortresses of Norsemen before being defeated by a Maclean chieftain. The early 20th century antiquary Erskine Beveridge considered it as one of the four most interesting fortifications, on Coll (along with Dùn an Achaidh, Dùn Anlaimh, and Dùn Morbhaidh).

Etymology

Dùn Dubh translates from Scottish Gaelic as "the black dun".

Location
Dùn Dubh is located on a rocky ridge, on the northern coast of Coll.

Description
The fort sits upon a rocky ridge, which runs north-west and southeast. There is a high, rocky boss on the southeast end of the ridge, and a series of terraces on the northwest. These terraces drop steeply on the west end of the ridge, and almost vertically on the south end. Beveridge considered the fort to have been built on a very strong site since the west and south sides were inaccessible due to the sheer precipices. He likened the cliff, or ridge, on which the fort sits, to the one that Dùn Beic occupies.

The eastern side of the ridge is guarded by a series of walls. The innermost wall (wall A), runs along the crest of the ridge. These enclosures are made of stone from gathered from the ruins of the fort. Only the foundation of the other enclosure survives.

About  down the slope, below wall A, there is another wall (wall B). The north-east flank is defended by another wall. One northern stretch of this wall seals a narrow gully.

In 1972, the site was visited by the Ordnance Survey who could find no trace of the well and determined that the only stones in the area were from the fort itself.

Archaeological finds
Beveridge noted several archaeological finds at Dùn Dubh, including hammerstones, fragments of coarse pottery, and small rounded pebbles which were similar to ones found at Dùn Beic.

Traditions concerning Dùn Dubh and other nearby fortifications
In the late 19th and early 20th centuries, several Coll traditions were published which concerned several fortifications (forts, duns, and crannogs) on the island—one of which was Dùn Dubh. One such tradition was collected by Rev. John Gregorson Campbell, a former parish minister of Tiree, and published in 1895. Campbell's version runs as follows:

According to Beveridge in 1903, the forts mentioned within this tradition are Dùn Anlaimh, Dùn Beic at Totronald, and Dùn Dubh. The Iain Garbh mentioned was a son of Lachlann Bronnach, chief of the Macleans of Duart (d. after 1472). Iain Garbh (b.  1450) is claimed to be the ancestor of the Macleans of Coll. Beveridge also made note of traditions of another battle fought near Grishipol, in which Iain Garbh and his followers defeated a force led by his step-father Gilleonan, chief of the MacNeils of Barra. Beveridge reasoned that this particular battle against the MacNeils probably took place around 1470–1480; and wondered if there could be some sort of confusion between this conflict with the MacNeils and that of the Norsemen.

In 1903, without prior knowledge to Campbell's tradition, Beveridge published another version of the 'Norsemen tradition' quoted above; one in which he had obtained viva voce. According to Beveridge, the events within this version of the tradition were said to have taken place at the precise date of 1384. However, he conceded that this date was calculated by the fact that when the Macleans of Coll sold their estate on the island in 1854, it was believed that they had owned their lands there for exactly 472 years. Beveridge also noted that the first historical connection between any Maclean and the island of Coll appears in a charter of confirmation, dated 1495, which states the Macleans were granted a charter to the island in 1409.  Beveridge's version of the tradition runs as follows:

A version very similar to Beveridge's appears in the 1906 monograph written by Rev. Dugald MacEchern which was published in 1922. MacEchern acknowledges the work of Beveridge and his version runs as follows:

See also
Dùn Anlaimh, one the duns associated with Dùn Dubh in Coll tradition.

References

Archaeological sites in the Northern Inner Hebrides
Coll
Former populated places in Scotland
Fortifications in Scotland
Hill forts in Scotland